Per Malte Lennart "Plura" Jonsson (born 10 August 1951) is a Swedish singer, songwriter, and musician. He has been a long-time member of the Swedish rock band Eldkvarn in addition to his solo materials. In 2014, he also released an album jointly with Mauro Scocco as Mauro & Plura. Jonsson has also written several books during his career.

Solo work

In 1996, he released his album Plura from which was taken his single "Sången jag sparade till dig".

In Eldkvarn
Besides his solo work, since the 1970s, he is part of Eldkvarn, a Swedish rock band formed in Norrköping in 1971, consisting of Plura Jonsson, the main songwriter, singer and rhythm guitarist of the band, his brother Carl Jonsson, lead guitarist who also writes songs and is backing vocals and bass player Tony Thorén, who has produced a number of albums by Eldkvarn, as well as other artists. The band is very active and widely regarded as one of the best rock bands in Sweden, with a following in other Nordic countries as well.

Television
Because of his popularity, he has taken part in a number of television productions, most notably the 2008 TV series Vem tror du att du är?. In 2010, he was in the first series of the Swedish TV series Så mycket bättre where a number of artists get together to cooperate and sing interpretations of each other's works.

Personal life
In 2012, he married Maria Sjöstedt, his long-time partner.
He has 4 children with three different women.

Bibliography
 Resa genom ensamheten: svart blogg och det ljuva livet, 2008
 Texter & historier från den stora landsvägen, 2008, med bidrag av andra skribenter
 Pluras kokbok: Provence, Kungsholmen, Koster, 2009
 Pluras spanska kokbok: Mallorca, Barcelona, Estocolmo, 2011

Discography

Albums

Joint album as Mauro & Plura

Singles

Filmography

Television

References

Swedish male singers
Swedish songwriters
Swedish-language singers
1951 births
Living people